"Let's Get A Little Sentimental" is a song written by Mike Leander and originally released by The Montanas in 1970. It was released as a single but did not chart.

Craig Scott cover
The song was covered by New Zealand singer Craig Scott later that year.  It became a hit in his home nation, spending two weeks at number four.

Other versions
"Let's Get A Little Sentimental" was also covered by the British band The Sensations in late 1971.

References

External links
 

1970 songs
1970 singles
1971 singles
Decca Records singles
Songs written by Mike Leander
Craig Scott songs
Songs written by Eddie Seago